Mladen Milicevic (born 1958) is a composer of experimental music, sound installation, and film music. He is a professor and has been for many years the Chair of the Recording Arts Department at Loyola Marymount University in Los Angeles. He is best known for composing the score to the cult film The Room.

Early life and education
Born into a family of film-makers (his father Ognjen Milicevic was a cinematographer and his mother Zlata Milicevic was a film editor), Milicevic started playing piano when he was 6. He received a B.A. in music composition (1982) and an M.A. (1986) in music composition and multimedia arts from the Sarajevo Music Academy, in his native Bosnia and Herzegovina, where he studied with Josip Magdic. Milicevic came to the United States in 1986 to study with Alvin Lucier at Wesleyan University in Connecticut, where he received his master's degree in experimental music composition (1988). After Wesleyan, he went to study with Dennis Kam at the University of Miami in Florida, where he received his doctorate degree in computer and experimental music composition in 1991. He also studied for several summers at the Aspen Music School/Festival with Michael Czajkowski.

Career
In the nineties, Milicevic has concentrated on live interactive electronic music composition utilizing hyperinstruments. He was awarded several music prizes for his compositions in the former Yugoslavia as well as in Europe. Milicevic worked in Yugoslavia as a freelance composer for 10 years, where he composed for theater, films, radio and television, also receiving several prizes for this body of work. Since he moved to the United States in 1986, Milicevic has performed his live electronic music, composed for modern dances, made several experimental animated films and videos, set up installations and video sculptures, had exhibitions of his paintings, and scored for films. His film music can be heard at his website.

He presents on variety of topics at many international conferences ranging from film, music, religion, psychology and neuroscience of (film, music, and religion,) sociology, aesthetics, cultural studies, and education. Milicevic is very interested in interdisciplinary connections among all these disciplines. For example, in education, he is using brain based learning in order to improve his teaching effectiveness. Milicevic's most popular class at Loyola Marymount University is Movie Music class, where he approaches film music from the neuroscientific and psychological point of view.

Commercial work
In the former Yugoslavia, Milicevic (using the alias Igor Krik) produced the 1985 pop band, VALENTINO, that sold platinum.

In 2003, he composed the score for the cult film The Room, directed by Tommy Wiseau. He later wrote the score for Wiseau's 2004 documentary Homeless in America, and in 2015, scored a documentary about The Room, titled Room Full of Spoons.

In 2009, he also produced an album entitled I've Got a Song for You by Rade Šerbedžija and Miroslav Tadić. For this work, he was nominated for the Porin award in Croatia as the best-produced album.

He scored a documentary, Cuba: The Forgotten Revolution, which won an Emmy in 2016.

References

External links

Ognjenka Milicevic (aunt)

Nika Milicevic (grandfather)

1958 births
Living people
20th-century classical composers
21st-century classical composers
Experimental composers
Aspen Music Festival and School alumni
Loyola Marymount University faculty
University of Miami Frost School of Music alumni
Wesleyan University alumni
Musicians from Sarajevo
Yugoslav emigrants to the United States
Bosnia and Herzegovina composers
Bosnia and Herzegovina film score composers
American classical composers
American experimental musicians
American film score composers